Tegel is a locality in Berlin, Germany.

Tegel may also refer to:

 Berlin Tegel Airport, in Berlin, Germany
 Lake Tegel, in Berlin, Germany
 Tegel Foods, New Zealand poultry company
 Peter Tegel, British translator
 Jöran Persson Tegel, 16th-century Swedish politician
 Tegel, a fictional character in the video game Tegel's Mercenaries

See also 

 Tegal (disambiguation)